The Tyndall effect is light scattering by particles in a colloid or in a very fine suspension. Also known as Tyndall scattering, it is similar to Rayleigh scattering, in that the intensity of the scattered light is inversely proportional to the fourth power of the wavelength, so blue light is scattered much more strongly than red light. An example in everyday life is the blue colour sometimes seen in the smoke emitted by motorcycles, in particular two-stroke machines where the burnt engine oil provides these particles.

Under the Tyndall effect, the longer wavelengths are transmitted more, while the shorter wavelengths are more diffusely reflected via scattering. The Tyndall effect is seen when light-scattering particulate matter is dispersed in an otherwise light-transmitting medium, where the diameter of an individual particle is in the range of roughly 40 to 900 nm, i.e. somewhat below or near the wavelengths of visible light (400–750 nm).

It is particularly applicable to colloidal mixtures and fine suspensions; for example, the Tyndall effect is used in nephelometers to determine the size and density of particles in aerosols and other colloidal matter. Investigation of the phenomenon led directly to the invention of the ultramicroscope and turbidimetry.

It is named after the 19th-century physicist John Tyndall, who first studied the phenomenon extensively.

History 
Prior to his discovery of the phenomenon, Tyndall was primarily known for his work on the absorption and emission of radiant heat on a molecular level. In his investigations in that area, it had become necessary to use air from which all traces of floating dust and other particulates had been removed, and the best way to detect these particulates was to bathe the air in intense light. In the 1860s, Tyndall did a number of experiments with light, shining beams through various gases and liquids and recording the results. In doing so, Tyndall discovered that when gradually filling the tube with smoke and then shining a beam of light through it, the beam appeared to be blue from the sides of the tube but red from the far end. This observation enabled Tyndall to first propose the phenomenon which would later bear his name.

In 1902, the ultramicroscope was developed by Richard Adolf Zsigmondy (1865–1929) and Henry Siedentopf (1872–1940), working for Carl Zeiss AG. Curiosity about the Tyndall effect led them to apply bright sunlight for illumination and they were able to determine the size of 4 nm small gold nanoparticles that generate the cranberry glass colour. This work led directly to Zsigmondy's Nobel Prize for chemistry.

Comparison with Rayleigh scattering 

Rayleigh scattering is defined by a mathematical formula that requires the light-scattering particles to be far smaller than the wavelength of the light. For a dispersion of particles to qualify for the Rayleigh formula, the particle sizes need to be below roughly 40 nanometres (for visible light), and the particles may be individual molecules. Colloidal particles are bigger and are in the rough vicinity of the size of a wavelength of light. Tyndall scattering, i.e. colloidal particle scattering, is much more intense than Rayleigh scattering due to the bigger particle sizes involved. The importance of the particle size factor for intensity can be seen in the large exponent it has in the mathematical statement of the intensity of Rayleigh scattering. If the colloid particles are spheroid, Tyndall scattering can be mathematically analyzed in terms of Mie theory, which admits particle sizes in the rough vicinity of the wavelength of light. Light scattering by particles of complex shape are described by the T-matrix method.

Blue irises 

A blue iris in an eye is blue due to Tyndall scattering by a translucent layer of turbid media in the iris that contains numerous small particles, which are about 0.6 micrometers in diameter, that are finely suspended within the fibrovascular structure of the stroma or front layer of the iris. Some brown irises have the same layer, except with more amount of melanin in it.  Moderate amounts of melanin make hazel, dark blue & green eyes.

However, most brown & black eyes are only colored by melanin because it is the only functionally important eye color, which therefore lacks this turbid media due to its unnecessary function in protecting the eye from harmful UV rays.

In eyes that contain both particles and melanin, melanin absorbs light. In the absence of melanin, the layer is translucent (i.e. the light passing through is randomly and diffusely scattered by the particles) and a noticeable portion of the light that enters this translucent layer re-emerges via a radial scattered path. That is, there is backscatter, the redirection of the light waves back out to the open air.

Scattering takes place to a greater extent at shorter wavelengths. The longer wavelengths tend to pass straight through the translucent layer with unaltered paths of yellow light, and then encounter the next layer further back in the iris, which is a light absorber called the epithelium or uvea that is colored brownish-black. The brightness or intensity of scattered blue light that is scattered by the particles is due to this layer along with the turbid medium of particles within the stroma.

Thus, the longer wavelengths are not reflected (by scattering) back to the open air as much as the shorter wavelengths. Because the shorter wavelengths are the blue wavelengths, this gives rise to a blue hue in the light that comes out of the eye. The blue iris is an example of a structural color because it relies only on the interference of light through the turbid medium to generate the color.

Blue eyes & brown eyes, therefore, both seem to be anatomically different from each other in a genetically non-variable way because of the difference between turbid media and melanin also both kinds of eye color can remain functionally separate despite being "mixed" together.

Similar phenomena different from Tyndall scattering 

When the day's sky is overcast, sunlight passes through the turbid layer of the clouds, resulting in scattered, diffuse light on the ground (sunbeam). This exhibits Mie scattering instead of Tyndall scattering because the cloud droplets are larger than the wavelength of the light and scatters all colors approximately equally. When the daytime sky is cloudless, the sky's color is blue due to Rayleigh scattering instead of Tyndall scattering because the scattering particles are the air molecules, which are much smaller than the wavelengths of visible light. Similarly, the term Tyndall effect is incorrectly applied to light scattering by large, macroscopic dust particles in the air; however, due to their large size, they do not exhibit Tyndall scattering.

Gallery

See also 
 Light scattering
 Transparency and translucency
 Ultramicroscope

References 

Scattering
Scattering, absorption and radiative transfer (optics)
Smoke
Optical phenomena